Rudolf Anschober (born 21 November 1960) is an Austrian politician of the Green Party who served as Minister of Social Affairs, Health, Care, and Consumer Protection in the second government of Chancellor Sebastian Kurz from January 2020 to April 2021.

Political career
A former journalist and schoolteacher, Anschober served as a member of the National Council from 1990 until 1997 and held various positions in state politics.

Throughout his tenure in government, Anschober worked on the government's response to the COVID-19 pandemic in Austria. He consistently called for stricter lockdown measures in the face of high infection numbers, clashing with Chancellor Kurz and his party. By April 2021, he was diagnosed as suffering from high blood pressure, high blood sugar and early-stage tinnitus, which led him to resign from his office, effective 19 April 2021. At the time of his resignation, he was one of the country's most popular politicians.

Other activities
 Fonds Gesundes Österreich, Chair of the Board of Trustees (since 2020)
 National Fund of the Republic of Austria for Victims of National Socialism, Member of the Board of Trustees (since 2020)

Bibliography

Books

References

External links 
 Rudolf Anschober on the Austrian Parliament website

Living people
1960 births
Health ministers of Austria
The Greens – The Green Alternative politicians
People from Wels
21st-century Austrian politicians